Wild Child (Kyle Gibney) alternately spelled Wildchild and also known as Weapon Omega and Wildheart, is a fictional character appearing in American comic books published by Marvel Comics. The character has been depicted as both a superhero and a supervillain, and as a member of Alpha Flight, X-Factor and Weapon X.

Publication history

He was created by John Byrne and appeared in a cameo appearance in Alpha Flight #1 (Aug 1983), but he did not appear in full until Alpha Flight #11.

Fictional character biography
Kyle Gibney is a mutant who manifested a feral mutation during puberty; this mutation granted him enhanced physical abilities and an increased rate of regeneration. He also suffered from a bestial freakish appearance, which prompted his parents to throw him out of their house. Living on the streets, he was kidnapped by the conspiratorial Secret Empire and subjected to mind- and body-altering experiments. The experiments had the consequence of making him psychologically unstable, and in particular prone to violent and animalistic behavior. During this time, he became acquainted with Dr. Valerie Cooper, a United States government official who was unaware of the Secret Empire's true nature or activities. He was freed by Wyre, the man who had unwittingly been the source for the genetic material that was used in the Empire's experiments.

Gibney (now Wild Child) was detained by the military and given over to the custody of Canada's secret Department H, who oversaw the formative Alpha Flight team. The Flight member Walter Langkowski, wanting to protect the youth from the military, placed him in the trainee team dubbed Gamma Flight. After Alpha Flight and its trainee groups were officially disbanded, Gibney was recruited to join the first Omega Flight team, a group of professional criminals. Alongside Omega Flight, he battled Alpha Flight and was defeated. Alongside Omega Flight, he battled Alpha Flight again in the West Edmonton Mall, and was defeated by Madison Jeffries. Afterwards, he committed a series of murders, which ended when he battled and was captured by Wolverine after he severely injured and almost killed Alpha Flight member Heather Hudson.

Wild Child was subsequently pardoned under unrevealed circumstances and given membership in the new Gamma Flight. Alongside Gamma Flight, he battled Alpha Flight. However, he then aided Gamma and Alpha Flight against Llan the Sorcerer's forces. When Gamma Flight was disbanded soon after that, he went berserk over his deprecated status and attacked Pathway, another trainee. Gamma's leader Nemesis teleported him away during a fight with Heather Hudson (then Guardian) and Wolverine, and he was captured by Wolverine. Department H would later help him overcome his psychological problems and cure his mental illness, train him in unarmed combat, and place him as a special operative of the Canadian government assigned to Alpha Flight under the codename Weapon Omega. Alongside Alpha Flight, he battled Diablo. He joined Alpha Flight's "Core Alpha", met the second X-Factor team, and prevented the mind-controlled Omerta from assassinating Italy's head of state. He also fought a Wild Child doppelganger during the Infinity War. He was attacked by Wyre but rescued by Alpha Flight. He searched for Nemesis, and was held prisoner with her by Rok, but they were then rescued by Weapon X. He defeated Wyre in personal combat; he then learned about his true origin, and changed his codename to Wildheart. He aided Alpha Flight in combat with the Wrecker. He also became romantically involved with his teammate Aurora.

His appearance eventually deteriorated back to his initial feral form, which prompted him to leave Alpha Flight and Aurora. He followed Valerie Cooper to the United States, where he joined the government operated team X-Factor. There he began a romantic relationship with his teammate Shard. His feral teammate Sabretooth frequently attempted, with little success, to convince Wild Child to become a hunter and killer like himself. He remained with the team until his body began mutating towards a more feral form. He eventually degenerated to a near-mindless state and was recruited (either willingly or via brainwashing) by the new Weapon X team.

As part of his draft, Wild Child was paired with Sabretooth to try and recruit Sunfire to the program. The Japanese mutant refused and badly burned Sabretooth. When Wild Child mocked his burns Sabretooth viciously sliced through Kyle's vocal cords and threatened to kill any Weapon X medical staff who would operate on him, making sure that he would remain mute.

His past flame, Aurora, was also recruited into the team but she was not herself. After the Weapon X upgrades she became cocky and aloof, snubbing the ugly Wild Child and even engaging in a relationship with the horribly disfigured Director of the program. This became fuel for the fire when Brent Jackson attempted to undermine the authority of the Director Malcolm Colcord. Using Aurora's attitude toward him as motive, Jackson convinced Wild Child to join his splinter group.

Decimation
Wild Child was seen on a terminal screen as one of the mutants depowered after M-Day. His energy signature was found within the entity known as The Collective, along with the energy signatures of many other depowered mutants.

Post-Decimation
Wild Child recently demonstrated that his powers had returned as well as previously erased memories. He even managed to best Wolverine in a quick fight. He is now looking like his old Wildheart persona.

Wild Child appeared once more in conflict with Wolverine aiding Omega Red and attempting to kill Logan. He was doing so under the order of the enigmatic Romulus. His plan consisted of dropping Logan into molten steel; however, he was interrupted by Omega Red. While Wild Child and Omega Red battled each other, Logan managed to flee. Omega Red succeeded in distracting Wild Child and thus was able to impale him on his coils before throwing him into a vat of molten steel.

Dawn of X
In the new status quo for mutants post House of X and Powers of X, Professor X and Magneto invite all mutants to live on Krakoa and welcome even former enemies into their fold. Kyle Gibney joins a loose group of outcast mutants, operating under Mister Sinister: the Hellions, which also comprise Havok, Kwannon, Empath, John Greycrow, Nanny, and Orphan Maker.

Powers and abilities
Kyle Gibney is a mutant who was experimented upon, genetically engineered by Secret Empire scientists using DNA replicated from Wyre. He has superhumanly acute senses, as well as superhuman speed, agility, reflexes, coordination, balance, and endurance. His teeth and nails are hardened and strong enough to rend substances as thick as bone. His body heals at a rate several times greater than that of a normal human being but not at the rate of Sabretooth's healing factor. He also has various animal-like mutations common for "feral" mutants: leaf-shaped ears; eyes with neither pupils nor irises; sharper-than-normal teeth with pronounced, fang-like canines; and elongated fingernails and toenails which can be used as claw-like weapons, as well as his hunched body posture. He is an excellent hand-to-hand combatant with both special ops and martial arts training from Wolverine as well as the Canadian government's superhero Flight program, and is also trained in acrobatics and gymnastics. In his bestial rages, he relies more on sheer ferocity than fighting skill. As Wildheart, the savage, bestial side of his personality was suppressed by an unknown drug, but his savage self still threatened to overwhelm his sanity at all times.

As a result of injuries suffered at the hands of Sabretooth, who prevented him from getting medical treatment, Wildchild was mute for a time. However, along with his renewed powers, he seems to have regained the ability to speak as well.

Reception
 In 2014, Entertainment Weekly ranked Wild Child 93rd in their "Let's rank every X-Man ever" list.

Other versions

Age of Apocalypse
In the Age of Apocalypse alternate timeline, Wild Child was a member of the X-Men and was frequently partnered with Sabretooth.  Wild Child possessed a low level of intelligence (comparable to that of a dog) and an inability to communicate verbally. As such, he was kept on a chain leash to prevent him from harming any of the X-Men. For a time, he was Sabretooth's sidekick, as Creed had rescued Wild Child from being a prisoner of Apocalypse's son Holocaust but his current fate is unknown. The 2005 Handbook to the Age of Apocalypse states that Kyle is away on a secret mission with the other X-Men who were not present during the Age of Apocalypse 10th Anniversary Limited Series, though when Sabretooth and Blink revisited their home reality during a mission as Exiles, Magneto and Rogue revealed to them that Kyle had run away after Victor and Clarice had disappeared when they were taken away by the Tallus. He was eventually found and claimed by Quentin Quire. He then moved to the latter's reality to replace its deceased Wild Child, who was not supposed to have died.

Wild Child has since been returned to the Age of Apocalypse timeline as he is seen following and later confronting the X-Force. He is killed while, along with the X-Men from his world and X-Force, trying to stop Archangel's genocidal plans on Earth-616.

House of M
In the House of M reality, Wild Child (alongside Arclight and Mentallo) is a Red Guard member positioned in Australia to serve Exodus.

Mutant X
In the Mutant X alternate reality, Wild Child roams the wilds of Canada, feral, along with that reality's version of Sabretooth and Wolverine, both as feral as he. They operated under the name "The Pack." For a time, the hero known as the Brute ran with them.

Old Man Logan
In the pages of Avengers of the Wastelands that serve as a sequel of "Old Man Logan" and take place on Earth-21923, Wild Child is among the villains that attack Danielle Cage's group in Osborn County where they were killed by the insects summoned by Dwight Barrett's Ant-Man helmet.

Weapon X: Days of Future Now
Kyle is still a part of the splinter group of Weapon X, run by Brent Jackson.

Ultimate Marvel
The Ultimate Marvel version of Wild Child appears in Ultimate Comics: Wolverine #2. He and a few of his soldiers were tracking Wolverine's son, Jimmy Hudson to kill his adopted parents, the Hudsons: James Hudson and Heather Hudson. Jimmy pounces but is almost killed by Wild Child till Quicksilver appears and twists his neck around.

In other media

Television
 Wild Child appears in the X-Men episode "One Man's Worth". This version resembles the Age of Apocalypse Wild Child and is a member of Magneto's Mutant Resistance.

Toys
The Age of Apocalypse version of Wild Child was also made into a non-posable figure pack-in with Sabretooth for the Age of Apocalypse toy line manufactured by ToyBiz.

The Age of Apocalypse version Wild Child was produced by Hasbro. The figure is 1:12th in scale (6-inch), released as part of The Marvel Legends brand. It is one of 7 figures released in the Sugar Man Build A Figure Wave.

References

External links
 AlphaFlight.Net Alphanex Entry on Wild Child
 Wild Child at Marvel.com
 UncannyXmen.net Spotlight on Wild Child

Comics characters introduced in 1983
Characters created by John Byrne (comics)
Fictional Canadian people
Fictional characters with slowed ageing
Fictional characters with superhuman senses
Marvel Comics characters with accelerated healing
Marvel Comics characters with superhuman strength
Marvel Comics mutants
Marvel Comics mutates
Marvel Comics superheroes
Marvel Comics supervillains
Wolverine (comics) characters
X-Factor (comics)